Katherine Indermaur is a Swiss-American writer, poet, and magazine editor. In 2008, she was appointed as the first North Carolina Student Poet Laureate by Kathryn Stripling Byer. She authored the 2018 chapbook PULSE, the 2021 chapbook Facing the Mirror: An Essay, and the 2022 poetry book I/I, the latter received positive reviews from Diana Khoi Nguyen and Jenny Boully. She is a recipient of the 2018 Academy of American Poets Prize, the 2019 Black Warrior Review Poetry Prize, and 2022 Deborah Tall Lyric Essay Book Prize. Indermaur was a runner-up in 92nd Street Y's Discovery Poetry Contest in 2020. Indermaur is an editor at Sugar House Review and previously served as managing editor at Colorado Review and as an assistant editor at Alpinist.

Early life and education 
Indermaur is a member of the Indermaur family. On her mother's side, she is a great-granddaughter of the North Carolinian politician James Jefferson Webster. She is a cousin of Swiss author Mirjam Indermaur.

Indermaur attended John W. Ligon Magnet Middle School and William G. Enloe Magnet High School, graduating in 2008. Later that year she was appointed as the first North Carolina Student Poet Laureate by Kathryn Stripling Byer, the North Carolina Poet Laureate, receiving the Laureate award for her poem Downtown After Dark. She attended the University of North Carolina at Chapel Hill, studying English and creative writing. She earned a master of fine arts degree in creative writing from Colorado State University.

Career 
Indermaur works as an editor at Sugar House Review, a literary magazine based in Salt Lake City. She had previously worked as the managing editor for the Colorado Review in Fort Collins. She also served as a temporary assistant editor at Alpinist.

Her poems, essays, and articles have been published in CALAMITY, Muse/A Journal,  Coast|NoCoast, Colorado Review, Entropy, Poetry South, Borderlands: Texas Poetry Review, Frontier Poetry, Ghost Proposal, the Hunger, New Delta Review, Oxidant|Engine, Black Warrior Review, and Gramma Poetry. Her poem Replication of a Miracle was featured in Voicemail Poems.

In 2018 Indermaur released PULSE, a micro-chapbook published through Ghost City Press.

In 2019 she was a finalist in GASHER Journal'''s First-Book Scholarship for her work Girl Descends Asunder. Indermaur was the winner of the Academy of American Poets Prize in 2018 and the Black Warrior Review Poetry Contest in 2019. In 2020 she was a runner-up in 92nd Street Y's Discovery Poetry Contest.

In November 2022, Indermaur authored the poetry book I|I'', published by Seneca Review Books. She was selected by Kazim Ali as the winner of the 2022 Deborah Tall Lyric Essay Book Prize. The book received positive reviews from Diana Khoi Nguyen and Jenny Boully. In December 2022, Indermaur read excerpts of her book at Hobart and William Smith Colleges.

References 

Living people
21st-century American poets
21st-century Swiss poets
American magazine editors
American people of German descent
American people of Swiss-German descent
American Poets Laureate
American women poets
Katherine
James Jefferson Webster family
People from Raleigh, North Carolina
Poets from North Carolina
Swiss magazine editors
Swiss women editors
Swiss women poets
Women magazine editors
Colorado State University alumni
William G. Enloe High School alumni
University of North Carolina at Chapel Hill alumni
Year of birth missing (living people)